Stuart Roy Clarke is an English documentary photographer. His major works include The Homes of Football and Scenes from a British Summer Country Pop Music Festival.

Life 
Clarke was born in Berkhamsted, Hertfordshire, on 19 August 1961, the youngest of three children of Mary (née Punton-Smith) and Roy Percy Clarke, a quantity surveyor.

Career 
After several years of working for local newspapers in Hertfordshire and as a freelance photographer for the magazine Time Out in London, Clarke went to live in The Lake District, where he began The Homes of Football in 1990.

The football opus, documenting the changing face of the game, was self-funded initially but then evolved into a touring exhibition hired by various municipalities and shown in 80 museums and art galleries over a 15-year period. In 1997 Clarke also opened a permanent gallery to his football work in the Lake District, at Ambleside, in the county of Cumbria.

In 2005, he started Cumbria Surrounded, which went on to win the Lakeland Illustrated Book Of The Year in 2010.

Exhibitions

The Homes of Football

The Homes of Football is composed of photographs taken entirely on medium format film, without cropping, using a Bronica camera and a standard lens.

Clarke began The Homes of Football in the wake of the Hillsborough Disaster and the resulting Taylor Report. The earliest photograph in the collection is of four boys at Kilbowie Park, home of Clydebank, in 1989—a club and ground that has since disappeared. During the 1990s, Clarke made thousands of trips to football matches, photographing the crowd and the grounds themselves. The focus was on the ordinary football supporter, rather than the more 'glamorous' side of the game. Clarke was also the only official photographer for The Football Trust from 1991 and its successor The Football Foundation until 2005. The collection has been supported by the Professional Footballers' Association.

Exhibitions (UK unless specified)
 1991: The Homes of Football, Burnley Towneley Hall Art Gallery, Barrow Forum 28 Gallery, Leeds City Museum
 1992: The Homes of Football, Stoke Museum & Art Gallery, Derby Metro Gallery, Birkenhead Williamson Museum & Art Gallery, Coventry Herbert Museum & Art Gallery, Bath F-Stop Gallery, Wigan History Shop Museum, Hove Museum & Art Gallery, Bournemouth Russell Cotes Museum & Art Gallery, Scunthorpe Museum & Art Gallery
 1993: The Homes of Football, Maidstone Library Gallery, Bilston Museum & Art Gallery, Aylesbury County Museum, Durham DLI Art Gallery, Fulham Library Gallery, Mansfield Museum & Art Gallery, Peterborough Museum & Art Gallery, Huddersfield Art Gallery, Westminster House of Commons (one day only), Hitchin Museum & Art Gallery, Middlesbrough Art Gallery, Southend Focal Point Gallery, Blackburn Museum & Art Gallery, Guernsey Museum & Art Gallery, Salford Museum & Art Gallery, Milton Keynes Exhibition Gallery
 1994: The Homes of Football, High Wycombe Guildhall, Grimsby Heritage Centre, Swansea Industrial Museum, Belfast Ulster Museum, Carlisle Tullie House Museum & Art Gallery
 1995: The Homes of Football, Bradford Industrial Museum, Warrington Museum & Art Gallery
 1996: The Homes of Football, Reading Museum & Art Gallery, Edinburgh City Arts Centre, Liverpool Museum of Liverpool Life, Coatbridge Summerlee Heritage Park
 1997: The Homes of Football, Arbroath Art Gallery, Forfar Methen Art Gallery, Paisley Museum & Art Gallery, Prescot Museum, Barnsley Cooper Gallery, Stockport Art Gallery
 1998: The Homes of Football, Bristol Museum & Art Gallery, Kilmarnock Dick Institute, Yorkshire York Museum, Wrexham Arts Centre, Falkirk Callendar House, Birmingham Mac
 1999: The Homes of Football, Holyhead Arts Centre, Dunfermline Pittencrief Museum, Kirkcaldy Museum & Art Gallery, Exeter Museum & Art Gallery, Cheltenham Museum, Dumfries Museum & Art Gallery, Stranraer Museum, Kirkcudbright Museum, Lincoln Usher Gallery, Luton Artezium, London RIBA
 2000: The Homes of Football, Gillingham Library, Strood Library, Solihull Arts Complex, Oldham Museum & Art Gallery, Darlington Art Gallery, Hull Ferens Art Gallery, Watford Museum, Wakefield Art Gallery
 2001: The Homes of Football, Leamington Spa Museum, Sheffield Galleries, Warrington Museum
 2002: The Homes of Football, Leicester Museum, South Shields Museum, Coventry Herbert Art Gallery, Leeds Corn Exchange, Bolton Museum & Art Gallery
 2003: The Homes of Football, Cardiff St.David's Hall, Sunderland Art Gallery, Salford Lowry Outlet, Reading Museum & Art Gallery, Shrewsbury Museum
 2004: The Homes of Football / Football in our Time, Gateshead Library, Lisbon University Portugal, Bristol Museum & Art Gallery, Norwich Forum
 2012: The Homes of Football, National Football Museum, Manchester
 2013: The Homes of Football / True Colours, National Football Museum, Manchester
 2014: The Homes of Football / Northern League 125, National Football Museum, Manchester
 2018 - 2019 The Game, National Football Museum, Manchester

Semi-permanent exhibitions 
 1997–2011: The Homes of Football at Ambleside: three-storey Museum
 2001–2007: Homes of Football: At The Football Association HQ London
 2014–current: The Homes of Football: In the Courtyard of FA Centre of Excellence, St George's Park National Football Centre

Critical response
John Motson called the work "A unique and wonderful collection of football scenes. Stuart Roy Clarke puts a new perspective on the game."

Bryan Robson, the then manager of Middlesbrough, wrote in 1996 that “Stuart Clarke has brought to life the international game of football with a series of outstanding, innovative and often witty photographs.”  Mike Foster, General Secretary of The FA Premier League added in 1998 “The exhibition really is paradise for any lover of football. The feelings I had were not dissimilar to walking into an empty stadium; soaking up the atmosphere and letting your imagination wander – you really do lose yourself in the surroundings” ... and in 2010 on the release of an anthology of Clarke's Homes of Football work adds "I never tire of looking at the photographs. They are captivating and evocative of a football lovers’ halcyon 

Kevin Roberts, CEO of Saatchi&Saatchi, described the Ambleside gallery as "an amazing experience" in a 2009 article about Clarke's work.

Philip Köster, managing director of '11 FREUNDE - Magazin für Fußballkultur' wrote that "Clarke depicts football at its core, which eventually makes its indestructible: passion. Whatever he takes photos of he always searches automatically for the emotional centre of the picture. Clarke is a documentalist of change, an incorruptible contemporary witness with a camera.”

Books 
 The Homes of Football (1996)
 Passion of A Nation (1999), Little Brown & Co
 More Than A Game (2001), Random House
 Football In Our Time (2003), Mainstream
 England The Light (2004), Giant Step
 Scenes From A British Summer Country Pop Music Festival (2010), SRC
 Cumbria Surrounded (Somewhere Across A Promised Land) (2010), SRC
 The Cradle of The Game (2010), SRC
 The Homes of Football / Where the Heart Is (2013), Bluecoat
 Britische Fussballkultur in Den 90er Jahren (2014), Panorama
 The Game (2018), Bluecoat
The Game Revisited (2019), Bluecoat

Television 
 A Common Passion (1996), ITV written and presented by Stuart Clarke
 Splendid Isolation (2000), ITV written and presented by Stuart Clarke
 The Homes of Football / Stuart Roy Clarke (2012), Northern Stars / National Football Museum / British Sea Power
 The Homes of Football / Inside Out (2013), BBC1
 The Homes of Football / True Colours (2013), FIFA Football Mundial
 Stuart Roy Clarke / Sport in Focus (2014), BT Sport
Christmas University Challenge (2018) / ITV Studios, BBC2

References

External links 
Clarke website

Living people
1961 births
Photographers from Hertfordshire
People from Berkhamsted
Alumni of the University of Westminster